"Hey, Western Union Man" is a 1968 soul single by Jerry Butler written by Butler with Kenny Gamble, and Leon Huff.  The single was Jerry Butler's second number one R&B hit on the Billboard chart, where it stayed for a week.  "Hey, Western Union Man" was also part of a string of Top 40 crossover hit that Jerry Butler had during the late 1960s.

Chart positions

Cover versions  
Al Kooper covered this track on his 1968 album I Stand Alone.
Diana Ross and The Supremes covered the song on their Let the Sunshine In album (1969).
In 1970, Grant Green covered this track on the live album Alive!, recorded at the Cliche Lounge in Newark, New Jersey.
Bruce Springsteen recorded the song for his 2022 album, Only the Strong Survive.

References

1968 singles
Jerry Butler songs
Songs written by Jerry Butler
Songs written by Kenny Gamble
1968 songs
Songs written by Leon Huff